The 2001 Grand Prix of Portland was the sixth round of the 2001 American Le Mans Series season.  It took place at Portland International Raceway, Oregon, on August 5, 2001.

Official results
Class winners in bold.

† - #4 Corvette Racing was disqualified for failing post-race technical inspection.  The car was below the legal weight limit.

Statistics
 Pole Position - #50 Panoz Motor Sports - 1:04:121
 Fastest Lap - #1 Audi Sport North America - 1:05.360
 Distance - 409.842 km
 Average Speed - 148.409 km/h

External links
  
 World Sports Racing Prototypes - Race Results

P
Portland Grand Prix
Port
2001 in Portland, Oregon
Grand Prix of Portland